Multiple Maniacs is a 1970 independent American black comedy horror film composed, shot, edited, written,  produced, and directed by John Waters, as his second feature film and first "talkie". It features several actors who were part of the Dreamland acting troupe for Waters' films, including Divine, Mary Vivian Pearce, David Lochary, Mink Stole, Edith Massey, George Figgs, and Cookie Mueller. The plot follows a traveling troupe of sideshow freaks who rob their unsuspecting audience members.

In 2016, American art house film distributor Janus Films and video distribution company The Criterion Collection undertook a new restoration of the film, with its preview for the restored print released June 17, 2016 at the Provincetown Film Festival, and its national exhibition began August 5, 2016.

Plot
Lady Divine is the owner and operator of The Cavalcade of Perversion, a free exhibit of various perversions and fetish acts and obscenities, such as the "Puke Eater". The show is free, but the various performers must persuade and even physically drag reluctant passers-by to attend.

As the finale to every show, Lady Divine appears and robs the patrons at gunpoint. This arrangement seems successful to  Mr. David, Lady Divine's lover, but Lady Divine becomes bored with the routine and decides to murder the patrons rather than merely robbing them. After escaping the murder scene, she comes home to Cookie, her prostitute daughter, and her new boyfriend Steve, a member of the Weather Underground.

Lady Divine receives a call from Edith, proprietor of the local bar, who informs her that Mr. David had been at her bar with another woman (Mary Vivian Pearce). Lady Divine heads there to catch them, but is raped on the way by two glue-sniffers. Meanwhile, Mr. David and his new lover Bonnie—a woman who desperately wants to be part of the troupe—engage in sex acts at the home he shares with Lady Divine, during which Bonnie anally penetrates him with a dildo.

While Lady Divine contemplates her rape, the Infant of Prague appears and leads her to a church. Making her way uncertainly into the church, Lady Divine prays, but is then approached and seduced by a strange young woman named Mink. They have a sexual encounter in the church pew, with Mink inserting a rosary in Divine's rectum while describing the Stations of the Cross.

Now lesbian lovers, Lady Divine and Mink go to Edith's bar with the intent to kill Mr. David and his mistress, but they are too late: David and Bonnie, who have by this time decided that they have to kill Lady Divine to protect themselves, have left.

Mr. David returns to Cookie's house, intending to kill Divine, instead he finds Cookie and fellow Cavalcade performer Ricky there. An argument ensues, and Bonnie accidentally kills Cookie. They tie up Ricky and hide Cookie's corpse just before Divine and Mink return. When Bonnie tries to shoot Lady Divine, Divine attacks and kills her with a knife. She then turns on Mr. David and eviscerates him as well, cannibalizing his internal organs, and becoming more frenzied. Ricky suddenly surprises Mink, who shoots him. In a fit of anger, Divine accuses Mink of betrayal and stabs her. Divine becomes even more crazed upon finding her daughter Cookie's body hidden behind the couch.

Exhausted from the ordeal, Lady Divine collapses on a couch and is subsequently raped by Lobstora, a giant lobster. In the aftermath (mumbling "You're a maniac now, Divine"), she destroys a car, then wanders Baltimore trying to kill anyone she can. The National Guard appear, surround Lady Divine on the street, and shoot her, to the tune of "America the Beautiful".

Cast
Divine as Lady Divine
David Lochary as Mr. David
Mary Vivian Pearce as Bonnie
Mink Stole as Mink / The Religious Whore
Cookie Mueller as Cookie Divine
Edith Massey as Edith the Barmaid / Virgin Mary
Paul Swift as Steve
George Figgs as Jesus Christ
Michael Renner Jr. as The Infant of Prague
Rick Morrow as Ricky

Production
Filming took place in Baltimore, Maryland. Waters has said he was influenced by Herschell Gordon Lewis's Two Thousand Maniacs! (1964) when writing the film, and the title Multiple Maniacs is a direct reference. Waters stated in a 2015 interview with the British Film Institute that the giant lobster rape was played by Vince Peranio and his brother in a paper mache costume. The idea came from a combination of Salvador Dali, Jack Smith, a post card of giant lobster over the beach in Provincetown, Massachusetts and most likely from taking LSD and cannabis.

Release
Multiple Maniacs had its world premiere in Baltimore on April 10, 1970. Waters later recalled that he toured the film throughout the United States, showing it at small arthouse theaters and other venues which often required a deposit to screen features. The film also showed internationally, with screenings in England in early 1971.

Critical response
Upon the film's debut in 1970, The Baltimore Suns Lou Cedrone wrote: "Multiple Maniacs is very smelly, save for a moment here and there when the Waters humor is apparent. And humor he has. It's just a shame he has chosen to ignore that for the brutality which is not, as he and his audiences may think, a gas." In 1981, Geoffrey Himes, also of The Baltimore Sun, referred to the film as "thoroughly disgusting" yet "also quite funny at times."

The film holds a 100% rating on Rotten Tomatoes, Waters' highest-rated film on the site.

2016 restoration
A new restoration for Multiple Maniacs by the American film distribution company Janus Films and the video distribution company The Criterion Collection was previewed on June 17, 2016 at the Provincetown Film Festival, and its national exhibition began at the IFC Center in New York City on August 5, 2016.

The restored version was released on DVD and Blu-ray on March 21, 2017 by The Criterion Collection, featuring a commentary track by Waters among other newly produced special features. This release marked the first time the film had been available on a home format in 30 years, since its original VHS release by Cinema Group in 1987.

Box office
As of August 18, 2016, Multiple Maniacs has grossed $33,036 in North America.

See also
List of American films of 1970

References

External links

 
 
 
 
 
 
Multiple Maniacs: Genuine Trash an essay by Linda Yablonsky at the Criterion Collection

1970 films
1970 LGBT-related films
1970s black comedy films
1970s comedy horror films
1970s crime films
1970 independent films
American black comedy films
American black-and-white films
American comedy horror films
American crime comedy films
American independent films
Films about rape
Cannibalism in fiction
Films directed by John Waters
Films set in Baltimore
Films shot in Baltimore
Lesbian-related films
1970 comedy films
1970 drama films
Drag (clothing)-related films
LGBT-related black comedy films
1970s English-language films
1970s American films